Spialia phlomidis, the Persian skipper, is a butterfly of the family Hesperiidae. It is found in Albania, North Macedonia, Greece, southern Russia, Asia Minor and Iran. The habitat consists of dry steppe habitats at moderate elevations.

The length of the forewings is 14–15 mm. Adults are on wing from June to July in one generation.

The larvae feed on Convolvulus libanotica.

Subspecies
Spialia phlomidis phlomidis (Bulgaria, Greece, Turkey, southern Russia, Iran, Alai)
Spialia phlomidis hermona Evans, 1956  (Lebanon)

References

External links

All Butterflies of Europe
Lepiforum.de

Spialia
Butterflies described in 1845
Butterflies of Asia
Butterflies of Europe